Videnović is a Serbian surname. Notable people with the surname include:

Andrijana Videnović (born 1964), Serbian actress
Gala Videnović (born 1969), Serbian actress

Serbian surnames